Joseph Leopold Eybler (8 February 1765 – 24 July 1846) was an Austrian composer and contemporary of Wolfgang Amadeus Mozart.

Life
Eybler was born into a musical family in Schwechat near Vienna.
His father was a teacher, choir director and friend of the Haydn family. Joseph Eybler studied music with his father before attending Stephansdom (the cathedral school of St. Stephen's Boys College) in Vienna. He studied composition under Johann Georg Albrechtsberger, who declared him to be the greatest musical genius in Vienna apart from Mozart. He also received praise from Haydn who was his friend, distant cousin and patron.

In 1792 he became choir director at the Karmeliterkirche (Carmelite Church) in Vienna. Two years later he moved to the Schottenkloster, where he remained for the next thirty years (1794–1824). Eybler also held court posts, including that of court Kapellmeister (chapel master) (1824–33). The Empress Marie Therese commissioned many works from him, including the Requiem in C minor (1803).

Friendship with Mozart

Through Joseph Haydn, Eybler met Mozart, who gave him some lessons and entrusted him with the rehearsal of his opera Così fan tutte. Eybler also conducted some performances of Così fan tutte.

On May 30, 1790, Mozart wrote a testimonial for the young Eybler: "I, the undersigned, attest herewith that I have found the bearer of this, Herr Joseph Eybler, to be a worthy pupil of his famous master Albrechtsberger, a well-grounded composer, equally skilled at chamber music and the church style, fully experienced in the art of the song, also an accomplished organ and clavier player; in short a young musician such, one can only regret, as so seldom has his equal."

Mozart and Eybler remained friends to the end. As Eybler wrote: "I had the good fortune to keep his friendship without reservation until he died, and carried him, put him to bed and helped to nurse him during his last painful illness."

After Mozart's death, Constanze Mozart asked Eybler to complete her husband's Requiem. Eybler tried but could not complete the commission perhaps, it is thought, because of his great respect for the music of his friend Mozart. (Franz Xaver Süßmayr completed the task).

Last years
In 1833 Eybler had a stroke while conducting Mozart's Requiem and thereafter could not fulfill his duties at the Court. For his service to the Court, Eybler was raised to the nobility in 1835 and was known henceforth as Joseph Leopold, Edler von Eybler. He died in Vienna on 24 July 1846.

Works

Eybler's main compositions were sacred music, including oratorios, masses, cantatas, offertories, graduals, and his requiem. His other works include an opera, instrumental music (especially his string quintets), and songs.

Of special note may be the Clarinet Concerto (HV160) he wrote most probably for "Mozart's" clarinetist Anton Stadler. A recording of this concerto by Dieter Klöcker is available on the Novalis music label.

Works list

HV 1 \ Missa Sancti Hermani in C major
HV 2 \ Missa Sancti Michaelis in C major
HV 3 \ Missa Sancti Ludovici in C major
HV 4 \ Missa Sancti Mauritii in C major
HV 5 \ Missa Coronationis Ferdinandi V Regis Hungariae in C major
HV 6 \ Missa Sancti Alberti in C major
HV 7 \ Missa in C major
HV 8 \ Missa Sancti Bennonis in C minor
HV 9 \ Missa Sancti Caroli in C minor
HV 10 \ Missa Sancti Joannis in C minor
HV 11 \ Missa Sancti Wolfgangi in D minor
HV 12 \ Missa Sancti Leopoldi in D minor
HV 13 \ Missa Sancti Ignatii in E-flat major
HV 14 \ Missa Sanctae Andreae in E-flat major
HV 15 \ Missa Sanctorum Apostolorum in E-flat major
HV 16 \ Missa Sancti Clementis in E major
HV 17 \ Missa Sancti Josephi in F major
HV 18 \ Missa Sancti Maximiliani in F major
HV 19 \ Missa Sancti Rudolphi in F major
HV 20 \ Missa Sancti Raineri in F major
HV 21 \ Missa Sancti Sigismundi in F major
HV 22 \ Missa Sanctae Eleonorae in G major
HV 23 \ Missa Sancti Georgii in G major
HV 24 \ Missa Sanctae Sophiae in G major
HV 25 \ Missa pro Sabbato Sancto in G major
HV 26 \ Missa Sancti Ferdinandi in G minor
HV 27 \ Missa Sancti Thaddaei in A-flat major
HV 28 \ Missa Sanctae Elisabethae in A minor
HV 29 \ Missa Sanctae Theresiae in B-flat major
HV 30 \ Missa Sancti Francisci in B-flat major
HV 31 \ Missa Sancti Theodori in B-flat major
HV 32 \ Missa Sancti Antonii in B-flat major
HV 33 \ Missa Sanctae Annae in B-flat major
HV 34 \ Gloria & Incarnatus for Michael Haydn's Missa in D minor
HV 35 \ Kyrie ad Missam in Coena Domini in E minor
HV 36 \ Sanctus in C major
HV 37 \ Requiem in C minor
HV 38 \ Graduale: Quem tuus amor ebriat in C major
HV 39 \ Graduale: Cantate Domino in C major
HV 40 \ Graduale: Omnes de Saba venient in C major
HV 41 \ Graduale: Sperate in Deo omnis in C major
HV 42 \ Graduale: Domine Deus omnium creator in C major
HV 43 \ Graduale: Unam petii in C major
HV 44 \ Graduale: Per te Dei Genitrix in C major
HV 45 \ Graduale: Lauda Sion salvatorem in C major
HV 46 \ Graduale: Os justi meditabitur sapientiam in C minor
HV 47 \ Graduale: Nocte surgentes vigilemus omnes in D major
HV 48 \ Graduale: Ecce sacerdos magnus in D major
HV 49 \ Graduale: Te summe Jesu fontem amoris in D major
HV 50 \ Graduale: Tua est potentia in E-flat major
HV 51 \ Graduale: Omni die dic Mariae laudes in E-flat major
HV 52 \ Graduale: Pater noster in E-flat major
HV 53 \ Graduale: Specie tua in F major
HV 54 \ Graduale: Christus factus est pro nobis in F major
HV 55 \ Graduale: Benedicam Dominum in omni tempore in F major
HV 56 \ Graduale: Non in multitudine est virtus tua Domine in F major
HV 57 \ Graduale: Alma redemptoris Mater in G major
HV 58 \ Graduale: Victimae paschali laudes in G major
HV 59 \ Graduale: Beata gens cuius est Deus in G major
HV 60 \ Graduale: Peccata dimittis in G major
HV 61 \ Graduale: Dies sanctificatus illuxit nobis in G major
HV 62 \ Graduale: Dominus in Sina in sancto in G major
HV 63 \ Graduale: Tu Domine Pater noster in G major
HV 64 \ Graduale: Benedictus es in A-flat major
HV 65 \ Graduale: Ave Maria gratia plena in A major
HV 66 \ Graduale: Cantate Domino in A major
HV 67 \ Graduale: Magnificate Dominum mecum in B-flat major
HV 68 \ Graduale: Exaltate Dominum Deum in B-flat major
HV 69 \ Graduale: Iste est qui ante Deum in B-flat major
HV 70 \ Graduale: Justus ut palma florebit in B-flat major
HV 71 \ Graduale: Bone Deus amor Deus in B-flat major
HV 72 \ Graduale: Populum humilem salvum in B-flat major
HV 73 \ Graduale: Alleluia confitemini Domino in B-flat major
HV 74 \ Graduale: Reges Tharsis et Saba in D major (doubtful)
HV 75 \ Graduale: Domine cor mundum (doubtful, maybe composed by Oehlinger)
HV 76 \ Offertory: Nos populus tuus in C major
HV 77 \ Offertory: Jubilate Deo in C major
HV 78 \ Offertory: Tui sunt coeli et tua est terra in C major
HV 79 \ Offertory: Confirma hoc Deus in C major
HV 80 \ Offertory: Ascendit Deus in C major
HV 81 \ Offertory: Tres sunt qui testimonium in C major
HV 82 \ Offertory: Audite vocem magnam dicentem in C major
HV 83 \ Offertory: Surrexit vere tumulo in C major
HV 84 \ Offertory in C major (text missing)
HV 85 \ Offertory: Terra tremuit et quievit in C minor
HV 86 \ Offertory: Si consistent adversum me castra in C minor
HV 87 \ Offertory: Timebunt gentes nomen tuum Domine in C minor
HV 88 \ Offertory: Domine si observaveris iniquitates in C minor
HV 88 \ Offertory: Haec est dies qua candida in D major
HV 90 \ Offertory: Summe Deus te semper laudum in D major
HV 91 \ Offertory: Jubilate Deo omnis terra in D major
HV 92 \ Offertory: Fremit mare cum furore in D minor
HV 92 \ Offertory: Laus sit Deo in excelsis in D major
HV 94 \ Offertory: Tremit mare in D minor
HV 95 \ Offertory: Lux est orta in E-flat major
HV 96 \ Offertory: Ad te o summa bonitas in E-flat major
HV 97 \ Offertory: Levavi oculos meos in E major
HV 98 \ Offertory: Ad te levavi animam meam in F major
HV 99 \ Offertory: Confitebor Domino in F major
HV 100 \ Offertory: O Maria virgo pia in G major
HV 101 \ Offertory: Domine Deus salutis meae in G major
HV 102 \ Offertory: Lauda Sion salvatorem in G major (incorrectly attributed to Eybler; correctly: Michael Haydns Offertory Lauda Sion, MH 215)
HV 103 \ Offertory: Tecum principium in die virtutis tuae in G major
HV 104 \ Offertory: Levavi in montes oculos meos in G minor
HV 105 \ Offertory: Confitebor tibi Domine in A major
HV 106 \ Offertory: Laudate pueri Dominum in B-flat major
HV 107 \ Offertory: Reges Tharsis et insulae munera in B-flat major
HV 108 \ Offertory: Magna et mirabilia sunt opera in B-flat major
HV 109 \ Offertory: Emitte spiritum tuum in B-flat major
HV 110 \ Antiphon: Regina coeli laetare in C major
HV 111 \ Antiphon: Regina coeli laetare in D major
HV 112 \ Antiphon: Salve Regina in F major
HV 113 \ Antiphon: Salve Regina in G major
HV 114 \ Te Deum in C major (1807)
HV 115 \ Te Deum in C major (1814)
HV 116 \ Te Deum in C major (1824)
HV 117 \ Te Deum in C major
HV 118 \ Te Deum in D major (1800)
HV 119 \ Te Deum in D major (1819)
HV 120 \ Te Deum in B-flat major
HV 121 \ Hymn: Veni sancte spiritus in C major
HV 122 \ Hymn: Alleluia in C major
HV 123 \ Hymn: Tristes erant apostoli in C minor
HV 124 \ Hymn: Iste confessor in D minor
HV 125 \ Hymn: Ecce quo modo moritur justus in F major
HV 126 \ Hymn: Coelestis urbs Jerusalem in F major
HV 127 \ Hymn: Exultet orbis gaudiis in F major
HV 128 \ Hymn: Tantum ergo in F major
HV 129 \ Hymn: Veni sancte spiritus in G major
HV 130 \ Hymn: Jesu nostra redemptio in G major
HV 131 \ Hymn: Asperges me Domine
HV 132 \ De profundis clamavi in G minor
HV 133 \ Laudate Dominum in A minor
HV 134 \ Miserere in D minor
HV 135 \ Litaniae in F major
HV 136 \ Tibi aeterno Deo haec cantica in G major
HV 137 \ Die vier letzten Dinge
HV 138 \ Die Hirten bei der krippe zu Bethlehem
HV 139 \ Dich Schöpfer sanfter Harmonie
HV 140 \ Il sacrifizio
HV 141 \ Die Macht der Tonkunst
HV 142 \ Der Zauberschwert
HV 143 \ Overture to Der Zauberschwert for piano in B-flat major
HV 144 \ Lied: Ein Weibchen das den ganzen Tag in C major
HV 145 \ Lied: Es liebt sich so traulich in E-flat major
HV 146 \ Lied: Ich bin in den Blühmond der Rosen in F major
HV 147 \ Lied: Von Millionen eine allein in G minor
HV 148 \ Lied: Ich will nichts von Liebe wissen in G major
HV 149 \ Lied: Sogleich empfand ich beym Erblicken in B-flat major
HV 150 \ Lied: Von der treue Arm umwunden in E minor
HV 151 \ Scena ed aria for Coriolan
HV 152 \ Scena ed quartetto for Coriolan
HV 153 \ Vanne torna altro...Combattero da forte in D major
HV 154 \ Dov'è la sposa mia...Svenami pur in E-flat major
HV 155 \ Sposa d'Emireno tu sei...L'ombra incerta in E-flat major
HV 156 \ Die Familie des T.C. Gracchus
HV 157 \ Ouverture in C minor, Op. 8
HV 158 \ Symphony in C major
HV 159 \ Symphony in D major
HV 160 \ Clarinet Concerto in B-flat major
HV 161 \ Divertimento für die Faschingsdienstag in D major
HV 162 \ 12 Minuets with trios for orchestra
HV 163 \ 12 Minuets with trios for orchestra
HV 164 \ 12 Minuets for orchestra
HV 165 \ 12 Minuets with trios for orchestra
HV 166 \ 12 Minuets with trios for orchestra
HV 167 \ 12 Minuets for orchestra
HV 168 \ 8 Minuets with trios for orchestra
HV 169 \ 8 Minuets with trios for orchestra
HV 170 \ 7 Minuets with trios for orchestra
HV 171 \ 5 Minuets with trios for orchestra (2 are lost)
HV 172 \ 13 German Dances for orchestra
HV 173 \ 12 German Dances for orchestra
HV 174 \ 12 German Dances with trios for orchestra (lost)
HV 175 \ 12 German Dances for orchestra (lost)
HV 176 \ 8 German Dances with trios for orchestra
HV 177 \ Contredanze con 6 alternativi for orchestra
HV 178 \ 3 Contredances for orchestra
HV 179 \ Eccossè con 6 alternativi for orchestra
HV 180 \ Dances for orchestra
HV 181 \ Polonaise for orchestra in C major
HV 182 \ String Sextet in D major
HV 183 \ String Quintet Op. 5 in E-flat major
HV 184 \ Viola d'amore Quintet in D major
HV 185 \ Viola d'amore Quintet in D major
HV 186 \ String Quintet in D major
HV 187 \ String Quintet Op. 6 No. 2 in A major
HV 188 \ String Quintet Op. 6 No. 1 in B-flat major
HV 189 \ Flute Quintet in D major
HV 190 \ String Quartet Op. 1 No. 1 in D major
HV 191 \ String Quartet Op. 1 No. 2 in C minor
HV 192 \ String Quartet Op. 1 No. 3 in B-flat major
HV 193 \ String Quartet Op. 10 No. 1 in E-flat major
HV 193a \ String Quartet Op. 2 in E-flat major
HV 194 \ String Quartet Op. 10 No. 2 in A major
HV 194a \ String Quartet Op. 3 in A major
HV 195 \ String Quartet Op. 10 No. 3 in C major
HV 195a \ String Quartet Op. 4 in C major
HV 196 \ Variations "Augustin" for string quartet in G major
HV 197 \ String Trio Op. 2 in C major
HV 198 \ Piano Trio Op. 4 in E-flat major
HV 199 \ Sonata for piano & violin Op. 9 No. 1 in C major
HV 200 \ Sonata for piano & violin Op. 9 No. 2 in F major
HV 201 \ Sonata for piano & violin Op. 9 No. 3 in B-flat major
HV 202 \ Sonata for piano & violin in E-flat major
HV 203 \ Sonata for 2 cellos Op. 7 No. 1 in G major
HV 204 \ Sonata for 2 cellos Op. 7 No. 2 in D minor
HV 205 \ 12 Minuets for piano
HV 206 \ 12 German Dances with trios for piano
HV 207 \ 12 German Dances with trios for piano
HV 208 \ 12 Minuets with trios for piano
HV 209 \ 12 German Dances for piano
HV 210 \ 8 German Dances with trios for piano
HV 211 \ 12 Dances for piano
HV 212 \ 9 Dances for piano "Alexander's Favorit"
HV 213 \ 10 Variations for piano in F major
HV 214 \ 12 Variations for piano in A major
HV 215 \ 12 Variations for piano
HV 216 \ 3 Marches for piano
HV 217 \ 12 Lieder
HV 218 \ Lied: Auf Weihnacht in E major
HV 219 \ Lied: Klagtöne in A-flat major
HV 220 \ Lied: Das Wohltun (lost)
HV 221 \ Lied: Von allen Sterblichen auf Erden (lost)
HV 222 \ Studies for voice & continuo
HV 223 \ Lied: Getröstetes Heimweh in E major
HV 224 \ Lied: Danklied an Gott in E major
HV 225 \ Lied: Ich will vertrauen in F major
HV 226 \ Auf Brüder auf in B-flat major
HV 227 \ Des Volkes Wunsch in C major
HV 228 \ Canon: Frau Mutter schönen Namenstag in G major
HV 229 \ Canon: Des Lebens sich zu freuen in B-flat major
HV 230 \ Canon: Wann i a Räuscherl hab in B-flat major
HV 231 \ Canon: Wohin du reisest, sei glücklich
HV 232 \ Choral: Hymne an Gott in E major
HV 233 \ Choral: Abendlied an einen Freund in A minor
HV 234 \ Choral: Leichengesang in A-flat major
HV 235 \ Ode an Joseph Haydn vom Fräulein Gabriele von Baumberg in C major
HV 236 \ Ode an Joseph Haydn vom Fräulein Gabriele von Baumberg in A minor
HV 237 \ Choral: Freimaurerkantate in F major
HV 238 \ Choral: Aus dem blühenden Vereine (fragment)
HV 239 \ Choral: Zufriedenheit mit Wenigen in B-flat major
HV 240 \ Es töne dann in rascher Saiten Sturme in D major
HV 241 \ Arrangement of Mozart's requiem in D minor
HV 242 \ Arrangement of Haydn's Gott erhalte Franz for orchestra in G major
HV 243 \ Choral after Haydn's Schöpfung (lost)
HV 244 \ Arrangement of Pergolesi's Stabat Mater in F minor
HV 245 \ Arrangement of Weigl's overture to Nachtigal und Rabe for piano in F major
HV 246 \ Sketches of a Kyrie and a Gloria for a Mass
HV 247 \ Mythological Ballet in E-flat major (fragment)
HV 248 \ String Trio in E-flat major (fragment)
HV 249 \ Choral: Laßt uns ihr Brüder in F major (fragment)
HV 250 \ Choral: Der Wanderer in C major (fragment)
HV 251 \ Missa Sancti Buon Compleannon in G major for piano

Notes

References
 Eva Badura-Skoda with Hildegard Herrmann-Schneider (n.d.) "Eybler, Joseph [Josef] Leopold, Edler von". Grove Music Online 
 Entry for Eybler in The Grove Concise Dictionary of Music, 1994, Oxford University Press, Inc.
 Program notes by Cordula Timm-Hartmann for Eybler's String Quintet and String Trio, 2005 recording by the Quintett Momento Musicale (MDG 603 1321-2)
 Joseph Eybler String Quintet Op. 6 No. 1, sound-bites and short bio
 Article on Eybler in Mozart Forum by Gary Smith

External links 

 
 

1765 births
1846 deaths
Austrian conductors (music)
Austrian Classical-period composers
Male conductors (music)
Edlers of Austria
People from Schwechat
Pupils of Johann Georg Albrechtsberger
String quartet composers
19th-century male musicians